Solo für Sudmann (English title: Solo for Sudmann) is a German crime drama television series that premiered on 23 January 1997 on ZDF. The show, which consists of one season in twelve episodes, is the first offshoot of SOKO München, launched in 1978 under the name SOKO 5113.

Synopsis
After chief inspector Jürgen Sudmann—former investigator at SOKO 5113—retires, he opens a private detective agency in Munich. Together with his assistant, Susanne Wegener, he solves cases in an unconventional way. Some of his former colleagues from the special commission (SOKO) make guest appearances, including chief inspector Horst Schickl, inspectors Lizzy Berger and Manfred "Manne" Brand, and detective Theodor "Theo" Renner.

Cast and characters
 Heinz Baumann as Jürgen Sudmann
 Esther Francksen as Susanne Wegener
 Veronika Faber as Johanna Naumann
 Kurt Weinzierl as Bank direktor Dreyfuss
 Wilfried Klaus as Horst Schickl
 Michel Guillaume as Theo Renner

See also
 List of German television series

External links
 

1997 German television series debuts
1997 German television series endings
German crime television series
German television spin-offs
German-language television shows
ZDF original programming
Television shows set in Munich